Ferdinand Schumann-Heink (born 9 August 1893 – 15 September 1958) was a prolific character actor with over 65 films to his credit. 

Though most of his films were uncredited roles, he wrote the screenplay for the 1930 film Mamba.

During the First World War Ferdinand enlisted in the U.S. Army Field Artillery, serving at Camp Funston, Arizona, until he was medically discharged with weakened lungs from pneumonia. Ferdinand's brother George Washington Schumann-Heink  died of illness whilst in the US Army. His brother August had returned to Germany, where he was killed in action with the Imperial German Navy when his U-boat hit a mine in the Mediterranean Sea.

Personal life 
Heink was the son of opera singer Ernestine Schumann-Heink. He was married to June Osborne.

Death 
He died in 1958 in Los Angeles, California. He was buried in Fort Rosecrans National Cemetery, San Diego County, California.

Selected filmography
 The Gallant Fool (1926)
 Hell's Angels (1930)
 Blaze o'Glory (1930)
 Fugitive Road (1934)
 The Widow from Monte Carlo (1935)
 Times Square Playboy (1936)
 Fugitive in the Sky (1936) (uncredited)
 Two Against the World (1936) as Sound Mixer

Notes

External links

1893 births
1958 deaths
American male film actors
American male silent film actors
Male actors from Hamburg
German emigrants to the United States
20th-century American male actors
Burials at Fort Rosecrans National Cemetery